Louisville Gaelic Athletic Club is a Gaelic Athletic Association in Louisville, Kentucky. The club was founded by John Johnson, Adam Shaw and Mickey Hughes in the fall of 2013. The team was practiced four times in 2013, played a full season of friendlies in 2014 and joined the North American in 2015.

External links
 

Sports teams in Louisville, Kentucky
Gaelic football clubs in the United States
2013 establishments in Kentucky
North American GAA
Gaelic Athletic Association clubs established in 2013
Irish-American culture in Louisville, Kentucky